The voiced alveolo-palatal sibilant affricate is a type of consonantal sound, used in some spoken languages.

The equivalent X-SAMPA symbols are d_-' or d_-_j and J\_+, respectively. There is also a dedicated symbol , which is not a part of the IPA.

This affricate used to have a dedicated symbol , which was one of the six dedicated symbols for affricates in the International Phonetic Alphabet. It is the sibilant equivalent of voiced palatal affricate.

Features
Features of the voiced alveolo-palatal affricate:

Occurrence

See also
 Index of phonetics articles

Notes

References

External links
 

Affricates
Alveolo-palatal consonants
Sibilant consonants
Pulmonic consonants
Voiced oral consonants
Central consonants